Two referendums were held in Ireland on 16 October 1968, each on a proposed amendment of the Irish constitution relating to the electoral system. Both proposals were rejected.

Third amendment bill

The Third Amendment of the Constitution of Ireland Bill 1968 define the apportionment of constituency boundaries in a manner which would have allowed a greater degree of divergence of the ration between population and constituencies.

Fourth amendment bill

The Fourth Amendment of the Constitution of Ireland Bill 1968 proposed to alter the electoral system for elections to Dáil Éireann from proportional representation by means of the Single transferable vote to the First-past-the-post voting system.

See also
Constitutional amendment
Politics of the Republic of Ireland
History of the Republic of Ireland

1968 in Irish law
1968 in Irish politics
1968 referendums
Ireland 1968
October 1968 events in Europe
Constitutional 1968